The Syria national women's football team is the national women's football team of Syria. The team was established in 2005, and is controlled by the Syrian Football Association (SFA), the governing body for football in Syria. Whilst the team has yet to qualify for the FIFA Women's World Cup, or the AFC Women's Asian Cup, their best achievement was when they finished third in the 2005 and 2022 editions of the West Asian Football Federation Women's Championship.

History

Women's football began to develop in Syria around 1950, when the first women's football team in the Levant and the Middle East was established in Aleppo. Despite this, a women's football league or national team was not established until the beginning of the 21st century.

Everything changed only in 2005 when the national team was formed as one of the first in the WAFF to play its first ever match in the 2005 West Asia Championship where the team lost 5–0 to the Iran selection on 23 September. The competition itself was followed by a 4–0 win over Palestine, as well as a 2–1 win over the Bahrain. Third place was achieved with six points. At the 2007 edition, the team did not get any points in the matches against Iran, Jordan and Lebanon and finished in fourth place.

At the 2010 WAFF Women's Championship they did not participate. In October 2010, the team competed at the 2010 Arabia Women's Cup. In Group A they finished third with three points. The three points came from a 12–0 win over Qatar, which was their highest international win.

The next participation in the West Asia Championship was in the following year 2011, where the team in Group B scored only one goal and no point and finished last again.

The team took part in the 2018 AFC Women's Asian Cup qualification for the Women's Asian Cup. In group D of a qualifying tournament in Vietnam in April 2017, not a single win could be achieved either. They lost 1–0 to Singapore. Losses to Vietnam, Myanmar and Iran followed, each by at least eleven goals.

In 2021, the Syrian Football Association decided to renew and develop the women's national team. The manager of the national team and head of the women's section of the SFA was former football player Nancy Muammar, and the coach of the national team was appointed Salim Jablawi. 

After home training camps, the team led by captain Elham Kord Oghlan played preparatory matches against Lebanon and the UAE. This preparation was followed by participation in the 2022 WAFF Women's Championship held in Jordan. In the first match, they faced a strong Jordan, losing 0–4, followed by a 1–1 draw with Palestine (goal scored by Aysha Hammou) and a 2–5 loss to Lebanon (goals scored by Gharib and Aya Mohammad). Despite two losses, the team took home bronze medals from Amman, as the final standings were decided by the number of goals scored, equaling the historic success in 2005.

Team image

Nicknames 
Syria women's national football team has been known and nicknamed as "Nosour Qasioun (Qasioun Eagles)".

Kits and crest 
Syria women's national football team wears red shirts with red shorts and red socks, following the tradition of the Syria men's team. The current change kit is all white. Like all SFA squads, the women's national team is supplied by Jako, which had provided and specifically designed current female football jersey since 2022.

Results and fixtures

The following is a list of match results in the last 12 months, as well as any future matches that have been scheduled.

 Legend

2022

Coaching staff

Current coaching staff

Players

Current squad
The following 23 players were called up for 2022 WAFF Women's Championship between 29 August and 4 September 2022.

Recent call-ups
The following players have also been called up to a squad in the last 12 months.

Competitive record

FIFA Women's World Cup

*Draws include knockout matches decided on penalty kicks.

Olympic Games

*Draws include knockout matches decided on penalty kicks.

AFC Women's Asian Cup

*Draws include knockout matches decided on penalty kicks.

WAFF Women's Championship

*Draws include knockout matches decided on penalty kicks.

Arab Women's Cup

Arabia Cup

Records 
As of 5 September 2022, the complete official match record of the Syrian women's national team comprises 33 matches: 7 wins, 2 draws, and 24 losses. During these matches, the team scored 39 times and conceded 144 goals. Syria's highest winning margin is 12 goals, which has been achieved against Qatar in 2010 (12–0).

FIFA world rankings

 Best Ranking   Best Mover   Worst Ranking   Worst Mover

Honours

Regional
 WAFF Women's Championship
  3rd place: 2005, 2022

See also

Syria women's national under-20 football team
Syria women's national under-17 football team
Sport in Syria
Football in Syria
Women's football in Syria
Women's association football around the world
Syria men's national football team

References

External links
FIFA ranking history

َArabic women's national association football teams
women
Syria
Women in Syria